Georgios Skatharoudis (born 2 November 1992) is a Greek professional footballer who plays as a striker.

Honours
Veria
Gamma Ethniki: 2018–19

References

1992 births
Living people
Greek footballers
Super League Greece players
Football League (Greece) players
Gamma Ethniki players
Veria F.C. players
A.P.S. Zakynthos players
Acharnaikos F.C. players
Anagennisi Karditsa F.C. players
Edessaikos F.C. players
Kavala F.C. players
Association football forwards
Footballers from Thessaloniki